Winnie is a marketplace for child care that helps parents find daycare and preschool. It contains data about child care providers including descriptions, photos, tuition information, licensing status, and availability data. Parents also use Winnie to ask questions and share their experiences. It is backed by a blend of automated data collection, curation, and crowdsourcing.

Background
Winnie is a startup based in San Francisco and was founded in early 2016 by Sara Mauskopf and Anne Halsall. The Winnie iPhone app was launched in June 2016. In October 2016, Winnie announced that it raised $2.5 million in seed funding. Winnie launched their Android app in March 2017. In May 2017, Winnie launched a daycare and preschool finder.

References

Further reading
Forbes - May 2020 - Interview With Melinda Gates: How Revolutionizing Our Caretaking System Is ‘The Key To Reopening The Economy’
Parents - May 2018 - This Is the Only App You Need to Find Quality Child Care & Kid-Friendly Places All Over the Country
TechCrunch - October 2016 - Winnie grabs $2.5 million for its directory of family-friendly places
Bloomberg - June 2016 - Interview on Bloomberg West: Meet Winnie

External links
Official Website

American review websites
Geosocial networking
Parenting websites
Consumer guides
IOS software
Internet properties established in 2016
Proprietary cross-platform software
Online companies of the United States
Recommender systems